Barm Shur may refer to:
 Barm Shur-e Olya
 Barm Shur-e Sofla